"Feelin' It" is the fourth and final single from rapper Jay-Z's debut album Reasonable Doubt. The song features a chorus sung by Mecca and a beat produced by Ski. The song's beat contains a sample from "Pastures" by jazz musician Ahmad Jamal. The track was originally meant to be a Camp Lo song, but producer Ski gave it to Jay at the last minute. He describes the situation in an XXL Magazine article: 

The chorus of the song was mocked by rapper 50 Cent in his song "Be a Gentleman", from his 2002 mixtape, Guess Who's Back?, and is a diss song against Jay-Z.

Formats and track listings

CD
 "Feelin' It [Video Version]"
 "Feelin' It [LP Version]"
 "Feelin' It TV track"
 "Friend or Foe"

Vinyl

A-Side
 "Feelin' It (Video Version)"
 "Feelin' It (TV Track)"

B-Side
 "Feelin' It (LP Version)"
 "Friend or Foe"

Samples
 West Coast rapper Tyga's song, "M.O.E." from his 2013 album Hotel California contains a sample of this song.

Charts

Weekly charts

See also
List of songs recorded by Jay-Z

References

1997 singles
Jay-Z songs
Songs written by Jay-Z
1996 songs
Roc-A-Fella Records singles
Songs written by Ski Beatz
Jazz rap songs